Joseph Beltrami (15 May 1932 – 24 February 2015) was a Scottish lawyer of Italian-Swiss descent. He is acknowledged as one of the foremost criminal solicitors in Scottish legal history.

Early life and family
Beltrami was born in Rutherglen, Lanarkshire on 15 May 1932. His father, Egidio Beltrami, was an Italian-Swiss man who had moved to Scotland to open a fish and chip shop, his mother Isabella was Scottish. Beltrami was brought up in Glasgow and educated at St. Aloysius' College. He graduated the University of Glasgow in 1953 having studied Law.

He struggled to find an apprenticeship at a legal firm, possibly due to his Roman Catholic heritage, so after a period in the Intelligence Corps for his national service in the 1950s, he set up his own firm Beltrami & Co.

Beltrami married nurse Brigid Delores Fallon on 14 January 1958 at St Andrew's Cathedral, Glasgow, and the couple had three sons who each went on to become lawyers. Edwin is the Chief Crown Prosecutor for the Crown Prosecution Service in Wales, Adrian is a QC specialising in commercial litigation, and Jason is a lawyer in Glasgow. He died, aged 82 on 23 February 2015.

Career
Beltrami was involved in several high-profile cases, including the campaign for the release of Patrick Meehan. He defended such names as Johnny Ramensky, Colin Beattie and gained the first ever Royal Pardon issued in Scotland defending Maurice Swanson.

Beltrami's most famous "client" was Hercules, a trained grizzly bear, who featured in Octopussy. The bear disappeared during filming of an Kleenex tissue advert on Benbecula, and was missing for over three weeks. His owner, Andy Robin, was prosecuted for failing to control a wild animal, but Beltrami successfully defended the man on the basis that Hercules was not wild as he was a "working bear".

He successfully defended Glasgow crime figure Arthur Thompson on many occasions throughout the 1980s, leading to the phrase "get me Beltrami" being coined as a plea for help in desperate circumstances amongst Glaswegians during the time.

Beltrami also successfully defended in 12 capital murder cases.

References

Scottish lawyers
Alumni of the University of Glasgow
People educated at St Aloysius' College, Glasgow
Scottish people of Italian descent
Scottish people of Swiss descent
1932 births
2015 deaths
People from Rutherglen